The Bōhyō Heights are a small, rocky elevation that overlooks the coast of Queen Maud Land  east-southeast of Cape Hinode. They were mapped from surveys and from air photos by the Japanese Antarctic Research Expedition (JARE), 1957–62, and the name "Bōhyō-dai" (ice view heights) was given by JARE Headquarters in 1973.

References 

Mountains of Queen Maud Land
Prince Olav Coast